Stefano Mondini (born 11 January 1987), brother of Matteo Mondini (president of the Italy National Team for Safety at Work), is an Italian footballer.

Biography
In June 2008, Mondini was sold to A.C. Cesena for €1.5 million in 2-year contract, but only in terms of player exchange. (Christian Jidayi) In June 2009 both players returned to their mother clubs for the same price. However Mantova bankrupted at the end of season, as Mondini along would cost thousand of euro as amortization.

References

External links
 AIC profile (data by football.it) 
 Website Matteo Mondini 

Italian footballers
Mantova 1911 players
U.S. Pistoiese 1921 players
A.S.D. Sangiovannese 1927 players
A.C. Cesena players
A.C. Mezzocorona players
Serie B players
Association football midfielders
Sportspeople from Monza
1987 births
Living people
Footballers from Lombardy